Innviertler Heimatblatt was a Nazi weekly newspaper published from Ried im Innkreis.

History and profile
Innviertler Heimatblatt was published between 1938 and 1945. It was the organ of the NSDAP for the Innviertel region. Innviertel Heimatblatt substituted Innviertler Zeitung, which had been published from 1918 and had been the organ of the German People's Party in Innviertel.

In 1945 Innviertel Heimatblatt was substituted by Innviertler Volkszeitung, which was discontinued in the same year.

Editors
The editors of Innviertel Heimatblatt included the following:

References

External links
Innviertler Heimatblatt archive

1938 establishments in Germany
1945 disestablishments in Austria
Defunct newspapers published in Austria
Defunct weekly newspapers
German-language newspapers published in Austria
Nazi newspapers
Weekly newspapers published in Austria
Newspapers established in 1938
Publications disestablished in 1945